Howard Mutton (21 October 1924 – 20 November 1992) was an Australian cricketer. He played in five first-class matches for South Australia in 1959/60.

See also
 List of South Australian representative cricketers

References

External links
 

1924 births
1992 deaths
Australian cricketers
South Australia cricketers
Cricketers from Adelaide